Françoise Choay (born 29 March 1925) is a French architectural and urban historian and theorist. Since 1973, she has been a professor at the University of Paris. She has also been a visiting professor at numerous universities in the United States, Belgium and Italy. 

Choay was born on 29 March 1925 in Paris. She was awarded the Grand Prix national du Livre d'architecture in 1981 and 2007.

Publications
— (1960) Le Corbusier, George Braziller 
— (1969) The Modern City: Planning in the Nineteenth Century, George Braziller
— (1992) L'allégorie du patrimoine, Seuil
— (1997) The Rule and the Model: On the Theory of Architecture and Urbanism, MIT Press
— (2001) The invention of the historic monument, Cambridge University Press

References

1925 births
Living people
French architectural historians
French women academics
Academic staff of the University of Paris
Architects from Paris
Historians of urban planning
Urban theorists
Members of the Academy of Arts, Berlin
French women historians